L'Assomption is a provincial electoral district in the Lanaudière region of Quebec, Canada, that elects members to the National Assembly of Quebec. It includes the city of L'Assomption and part of the city of Repentigny, as well as a few other municipalities.

It was created for the 1867 election (and an electoral district of that name existed earlier in the Legislative Assembly of the Province of Canada and the Legislative Assembly of Lower Canada).

In the change from the 2001 to the 2011 electoral map, it lost Saint-Sulpice and part of the city of Repentigny to the newly created Repentigny electoral district, but it gained Charlemagne and a different part of the city of Repentigny from Masson; it also gained the city of L'Épiphanie and the parish of L'Épiphanie as well as the part of the city of L'Assomption that it did not already have from Rousseau; it also gained part of the city of Terrebonne from Terrebonne electoral district.

In the change from the 2011 to 2017 electoral map, it lost all of its territory in Terrebone to the riding of Masson.

Members of the Legislative Assembly / National Assembly

Election results

^ Change is from redistributed results. CAQ change is from ADQ.

* Result compared to UFP

References

External links
Information
 Elections Quebec

Election results
 Election results (National Assembly)
 Election results (QuébecPolitique)

Maps
 2011 map (PDF)
 2001 map (Flash)
2001–2011 changes (Flash)
1992–2001 changes (Flash)
 Electoral map of Lanaudière region
 Quebec electoral map, 2011

Quebec provincial electoral districts
Repentigny, Quebec
Terrebonne, Quebec